Philippe Garot (born 30 November 1948 in Belgium) is a Belgian retired football player and later manager.

Career

He won the league with K.S.K. Beveren in 1983.

References

External links
 
 

Living people
1948 births
Belgian footballers
Belgian football managers
Association football forwards
Association football defenders
Belgium international footballers
R.C.S. Verviétois players
K.A.S. Eupen players
R.W.D. Molenbeek players
K.S.K. Beveren players
Belgian Pro League players
Challenger Pro League players
People from Verviers
Footballers from Liège Province